Lam Wai Kit (born 1966) is a Chinese artist born in Hong Kong. Lam graduated with her BA (Hons) in Fine Art at the Goldsmiths College, University of London, UK in 1996. In 2003, she graduated with her MFA at The Chinese University of Hong Kong.

Career 
Lam's media included photography, video art and mixed media. From 1996, she held several solo and group exhibitions in Hong Kong, Shanghai, Italy and Canada. Her works have been collected by the Hong Kong Heritage Museum, and also private collections in UK, Italy, Germany, Portugal, Canada, America, Australia, and Hong Kong. Selected works by Lam, Divided Minds (22) (2006) and Divided Minds (36) (2006), are featured on Google Cultural Institute's Google Art Project.

Lam is also an art educator and is now teaching at several art institutes in visual art and cultural studies. Lam works in a variety of media, including installation, photography, and video art.

Solo exhibitions

2012

• Five Senses - A series of 5 videos by Wai Kit Lam / Aesop Cityplaza, Hong Kong
• Sleight - Wai Kit Lam / Lumenvisum, Hong Kong  
• Small But Great - photography, video art & sound by Wai Kit Lam / Casa Monsaraz, Monsaraz, Portugal

2009

• Unknown - Works by Wai Kit Lam, Artists in the Neighbourhood Scheme IV / Hong Kong Film Archive & Tse Wan Shan Centre, Hong Kong

2007

• The Other Month; The Other Day / Schmidt Leica Photo Gallery, Hong Kong
• The Divided Minds V - Photography and video installation by Wai Kit Lam / Amelia Johnson Contemporary, Hong Kong

2004

• The Other / Shanghai Street Artspace, Hong Kong

2002

• Displacement / First Institute of Art & Design Gallery, Hong Kong

2000

• Frozen Words II - Dialogues within Oneself / First Institute of Art & Design Gallery, Hong Kong
• Frozen Words / The Gallery, Art Forest, Toronto, Canada
• The Secret Gardens / Montblanc Gallery at the Fringe, Hong Kong

1998

• This is you; this is not you / Agfa Gallery at the Fringe, Hong Kong

1997

• Beyond Colours / Dragon's Back Gallery at the Fringe, Hong Kong

1996

• Change / Goldsmiths, University of London, London, UK

Residency Programs Participated  

• 2014/3: Lichtenberg Studios / Berlin, Germany

• 2012/11 - 12: LKV - Lademoen Kunstnerverkstede / Trondheim, Norway 

• 2012/3: Casa Monsaraz / Monsaraz, Portugal

• 2011/1: Fundación Valparaíso / Mojácar, Spain

• 2009/10 - 12: Takt Kunstprojektraum Artist Residency / Berlin, Germany

• 2005/6 – 12: FUSE :: fusion: encoding future, Videotage / Hong Kong

Selected Grants Received 

2011/1
Fundación Valparaíso / Mojácar, Spain

2009/10 - 12
"Destination Berlin"—Artist-in-Residence Subsidy Scheme  / Hong Kong Arts Development Council

2002/6
Research Grant, Art Museum / The Chinese University of Hong Kong

Selected works

- The Green Mirror 綠色鏡子 (1993), colour photograph, size unknown

- This is you; this is not you 是你；不是你 (1998) b/w digital video 18’		

- The Secret Gardens: Portrait no. 2 秘密庭園：人像二 (1999) b/w photograph, silicon rubber, wood plate 7.5"x 15.5"	

- The Secret Gardens: Portrait no. 3 秘密庭園：人像三 (1999) b/w photograph, silicon rubber, wood plate 7.5" x 15.5"

References 

Hong Kong artists
Hong Kong women artists
1966 births
Living people